The gens Trebania or Trebana was an obscure plebeian family at ancient Rome.  Only a few members of this gens are known, chiefly from inscriptions.

Origin
Trebanius appears to be derived from the city of Treba in Sabinum, near the border with Latium. The similarly-named Trebatia gens likely derives its nomen from the same root.

Members
 Lucius Trebanius, triumvir monetalis at some point between about 135 and 126 BC.  His coins feature a head of Pallas on the obverse, while the reverse depicts Jupiter driving a quadriga.
 Gaius Trebanius Rufus, named in a bronze inscription from Neapolis in Campania.
 Publius Trebanus Salistianus, buried at Trebula Mutusca, aged thirty, in a first-century tomb built by his wife, Ulpia Sabina.

See also
 List of Roman gentes

References

Bibliography
 Joseph Hilarius Eckhel, Doctrina Numorum Veterum (The Study of Ancient Coins, 1792–1798).
 Dictionary of Greek and Roman Biography and Mythology, William Smith, ed., Little, Brown and Company, Boston (1849).
 Theodor Mommsen et alii, Corpus Inscriptionum Latinarum (The Body of Latin Inscriptions, abbreviated CIL), Berlin-Brandenburgische Akademie der Wissenschaften (1853–present).
 George Davis Chase, "The Origin of Roman Praenomina", in Harvard Studies in Classical Philology, vol. VIII, pp. 103–184 (1897).
 T. Robert S. Broughton, The Magistrates of the Roman Republic, American Philological Association (1952–1986).

Roman gentes